The Irish Naturalist was a scientific journal that was published in Dublin, Ireland, from April 1892 until December 1924.

History 

The journal owed its establishment to the efforts of several leading Dublin naturalists, notably George H. Carpenter and R. M. Barrington. The first editors were Carpenter and Robert Lloyd Praeger, of the National Library of Ireland. The journal was supported by a number of societies, including the Royal Zoological Society of Ireland, the Dublin Microscopical Club, the Belfast Naturalists' Field Club, and the Dublin Naturalists' Field Club.
The Irish Naturalist was published for 33 years and contained in total over 3000 pages. The journal ceased publication in December 1924. It had been having some financial problems, but the final blow came when Carpenter took up his appointment to the keepership of the Manchester Museum in 1923.

The journal was succeeded in 1925 by the Irish Naturalists' Journal.

Contributors 

Among notable contributors to The Irish Naturalist were:

 George James Allman
 Gerald Edwin Hamilton Barrett-Hamilton
 Alfred Cort Haddon
 Maxwell Henry Close
 Annie Massy

See also 

 Irish Naturalists' Journal, the successor to The Irish Naturalist

References

External links 

 About the Irish Naturalists' Journal, Detailing a brief history of The Irish Naturalist
 The Irish Naturalist, Digital versions of the journal in Biodiversity Heritage Library
 The Irish Naturalist, Digital versions of the journal on online repositories, listed on the Online Books Page

Biology journals
Mass media in Dublin (city)
Publications established in 1892
Magazines published in Ireland
Publications disestablished in 1924
Monthly journals
Defunct journals
1892 establishments in Ireland
1924 disestablishments in Ireland